Marcia Lipetz was a leader in the nonprofit community of Chicago. She helped set up the Center on Halsted and in the 1980s, was the first full time executive director at the AIDS Foundation of Chicago as well as what was to become the Alphawood Foundation.  She served on the board of the Illinois chapter of the American Civil Liberties Union.

After spending 11 years at Alphawood, Lipetz became president and CEO of the Executive Services Corps of Chicago.  She also did consulting at her own firm.

Biography
She was born and raised in Louisville, Kentucky, in 1947 to parents who were social workers.  She was immersed in tikkun olam, which is a Jewish concept of repairing the world. She graduated from Douglass Residential College (part of Rutgers University before earning a master's in sociology from Ohio State University and a doctorate in the same subject from Northwestern University.

Lipetz died September 11, 2018, at the age of 71 at her home in Evanston, Illinois, that she shared with her wife, Lynda Crawford. The cause of death was cancer.

Honors and awards
Lipetz was inducted into the Chicago LGBT Hall of Fame in 2009 because of her “leadership, energy, passion, and vision for Chicago’s LGBT community and the institutions affiliated with it, especially for her work with the AIDS Foundation of Chicago, the WPWR-TV Channel 50 Foundation, and Center on Halsted.”

Select Publications
 Snyder, D. S. (1981). [Review of Essential Sociology, by R. L. Ellis & M. J. Lipetz]. Teaching Sociology, 8(4), 445–447. https://doi.org/10.2307/1317080

References

1947 births
2018 deaths
American activists
People from Louisville, Kentucky
Rutgers University alumni
Ohio State University alumni
Northwestern University alumni
People from Evanston, Illinois
American women chief executives
American nonprofit chief executives
Deaths from cancer in Illinois
American LGBT businesspeople